1920×1080 may mean:

 An HDTV resolution
 1080p (1920×1080 pixels, 16:9 aspect ratio)
 1080i (1920×1080 pixels, 16:9 aspect ratio, using interlaced scan)
 A subset resolution for WUXGA (1920×1080)